Rock My Religion  is a (1984) no wave experimental art film by Dan Graham. It's also the title of a collection of essays written by Dan himself from 1965 to 1990.

Form and content
Created between 1982 and 1984 using television archives, the film is primarily made up of photographic and audiovisual montage and contains original music by Glenn Branca (Theme for a Drive Through Suburbia) and Sonic Youth (Shaking Hell and Brother James). It begins by concentrating on religious revivals and demonstrates interesting ties between religion and rock music beginning with Shakers ecstatic trance dancing. and continuing with the Ghost Dance.

Production
The movie was produced by Dan Graham and the Moderna Museet. It was edited by Matt Danowski, Derek Graham, Iam Murray and Tony Oursler. Rough editing was done at Nova Scotia College of Art and Design and at Young Filmmakers in New York City. Post-production was done at Electronic Arts Intermix, at Charles Street Video in Toronto and at Number Seventeen Video Facility in New York City.

Funding
Modern Museet, Stockholm, Sweden
NYSCA
CAPS Grant
Women's Interart Center

See also

List of American films of 1984
Mudd Club
Tier 3
Just Another Asshole
No wave cinema
Post-punk
Video essay

References

Further reading
 Kodwo Eshun, Dan Graham Rock My Religion, London: Afterall, 2012 
 The Museum of Modern Art, MoMA Highlights since 1980, New York: The Museum of Modern Art, 2007, p. 41

External links
Rock My Religion on Vimeo
Rock My Religion (excerpt)
Whitney Museum of American Art

American avant-garde and experimental films
1984 films
1980s avant-garde and experimental films
Collage film
1980s American films